
Gmina Chodel is a rural gmina (administrative district) in Opole Lubelskie County, Lublin Voivodeship, in eastern Poland.

Villages
Gmina Chodel contains the villages and settlements of Adelina, Antonówka, Borów, Borów-Kolonia, Budzyń, Chodel, Godów, Grądy, Granice, Huta Borowska, Jeżów, Kawęczyn, Książ, Lipiny, Majdan Borowski, Osiny, Przytyki, Radlin, Ratoszyn Drugi, Ratoszyn Pierwszy, Siewalka, Stasin, Świdno, Trzciniec, Zastawki and Zosinek.

Neighbouring gminas
Gmina Chodel is bordered by the gminas of Bełżyce, Borzechów, Opole Lubelskie, Poniatowa and Urzędów.

References

Polish official population figures 2006

Chodel
Opole Lubelskie County